The Keeley Creek is a river of Minnesota. It empties into Birch Lake in the Bear Island State Forest in St. Louis County, Minnesota.

See also
List of rivers of Minnesota

References

Minnesota Watersheds
USGS Hydrologic Unit Map - State of Minnesota (1974)

Rivers of Minnesota
Rivers of St. Louis County, Minnesota